Kho kho or kho-kho is a traditional Indian sport that dates back to ancient India. It is the second-most popular traditional tag game in the Indian subcontinent after kabaddi. Kho kho is played on a rectangular court with a central lane connecting two poles which are at either end of the court. During the game, nine players from the chasing team (attacking team) are on the field, with eight of them sitting (crouched) in the central lane, while three runners from the defending team run around the court and try to avoid being touched. Each sitting player on the chasing team faces the opposite direction of their adjacent teammates.

At any time, one player on the chasing team (the 'active chaser'/'attacker') may run around the court to attempt to tag (touch) members of the defending team, with one point scored per tag, and each tagged defender required to leave the field; however, the active chaser cannot cross the central lane to access the other half of the field, and can not change direction once they start running toward either pole. The chasing team can get around these restrictions if the active chaser either switches roles with a sitting teammate (by touching them on the back while saying "Kho") who is facing the other half of the court and therefore has access to it, or runs to the area behind either pole and then switches direction/half. Each team has two turns to score and two turns to defend, with each turn lasting nine minutes. The team that scores the most points by the end of the game wins.

The sport is widely played across South Asia, and also has a strong presence in the regions outside South Asia, such as South Africa and England. It is played most often by school children in India and Pakistan and is a competitive game. The first league of its kind called Ultimate Kho Kho was unveiled in India in August 2022.

Etymology 

History
Certain aspects of kho-kho's gameplay may have been mentioned in the Mahabharata. In pre-modern times, it is believed that a version of kho-kho known as Rathera was played on chariots (rath meaning "chariot" in Hindi). The modern form of the game was invented in 1914, with its rules and formalised structure being given by Pune's Deccan Gymkhana club. Kho-kho was demonstrated at the 1936 Berlin Olympics alongside other traditional Indian games. It is now a medal sport in the South Asian Games, having been played in the 2016 edition.

In July 2022, the player draft for Ultimate Kho Kho was completed, which is a six-team franchise-based Indian Kho Kho tournament. Its inaugural season ran from August 14 to September 4, 2022.
In 2016 world first social media network named KHO-KHO CHAMPIONS founded by PRINCE RAJ. This media network promotes the game from grassroot level and also provied all news and updates. for more you can visit website khokhochampions.com

Rules

Field 
The poles are smooth and round, with no sharp edges. There are -long extensions of the court behind each of the poles known as "free zones", in which there are no restrictions on chasers' movements.

Gameplay 
At the start of play, the active chaser starts off in one of the free zones, and can run into either half of the court to tag the three defenders. Once all three defenders have been tagged out or otherwise "dismissed", the next "batch" of three defenders comes onto the court.

The active chaser can switch roles with a sitting teammate by touching them on the back and shouting "kho"; this is known as the active chaser "giving a kho" to the sitting teammate. For the kho to be valid, it must be given before the active chaser has gone past the cross lane that the teammate is sitting within. Once a sitting chaser becomes active, they may only enter the half of the court which they were facing while they were sitting; additionally, once the newly active chaser steps to the left or right of the cross lane they were sitting in (or turns in such a way that their shoulders face towards either pole), they must continue in that direction until they have reached the free zone.

Violating any of these rules results in a "foul", in which case the active chaser can no longer attempt to tag any defenders. In order to clear the foul, the active chaser must move in the opposite direction of the one they were running in (i.e. away from the defenders they were chasing) until they have either given a kho to a teammate, or reached the appropriate free zone.

The chasing team scores points each time a defender is ruled "out" (dismissed), which happens either when a chaser tags a defender without breaking any rules, when a defender steps out of the court (with no part of the body remaining grounded within), or when a defender is late to enter the court after the dismissal of the previous batch.

Variations 
In one variation of kho-kho, a team is no longer allowed to chase once it has tagged all the players on the other team. The team that tags all of its opponents in the shortest amount of time wins.

Competitions

Ultimate Kho Kho 

Ultimate Kho Kho (UKK) is an Indian kho kho competition, and its first season took place in 2022. Many of the rules of kho kho are changed in this league:

 Only seven players from the chasing team are on the field.
 The playing field is only 22 meters long and 16 meters wide.
 Two points are scored for a regular tag, and three points are scored if a tag is made while a chaser is either fully outstretched and diving (known as a "Sky Dive") or touching a pole ("Pole Dive").
 The defending team scores two bonus points if any batch (group) of three defenders can avoid being eliminated for two and a half minutes, and two additional points for every 30 seconds afterward.
 One chasing player (known as the wazir) may run in any direction when acting as the active chaser.
 The chasing team can take a powerplay in each of their chasing turns during which they have two wazirs. Each powerplay lasts until all three defenders in the current group are out.
 Each team's turn to score/defend lasts 7 minutes.
 Tiebreaker (known as a "Minimum Chase"): Each team gets one additional turn to score, and the team that scores its first point the fastest wins.

See also

 Atya patya
 Langdi (sport)

References

 
Sports originating in India
Traditional sports of Bangladesh
Traditional sports of India
Traditional sports of Pakistan